The Birla family is a family connected with the industrial and social history of India.

Foundations
The Birla family origins lie with the Maheshwari caste of Bania Vaishya traders but they were outcast from their traditional community in 1922 when one of their member, Rameshwar Das Birla, was thought to have broken the caste marriage rules. They are Marwari and by convention merchants from Rajasthan are termed Marwari. The family originates from the town of Pilani in the Shekhawati region in North-east Rajasthan. They still maintain their residence in Pilani and run several educational institutions there, including the BITS, Pilani.

Shiv Narayan Birla
In Pilani during the early 19th century lived Seth Shobharam, grandson of Seth Bhudharmal, a local tradesman of modest means. It was his son, Seth Shiv Narayana (1840–1909), who first ventured outside Pilani. At this time, Ahmedabad was the railhead which serviced trade from a large region of northwest India. Goods (mainly cotton) would be brought from the hinterland to the city and sent from there by train to Bombay for export to England and other countries. Several cotton ginning units were also set up in Ahmedabad, to clean the cotton before shipment to England. Shiv Narayana Birla was one of the early Indian traders to participate in this cotton trade. Later, Britain vigorously fostered the trade of opium with China and developed the cultivation of poppy in India. The Ratlam-Mandsaur region (not far from Ahmedabad) became prime poppy cropland due to suitable soil and climate. Shiv Narayan Birla and his adopted son, Baldeo Das Birla, made an enormous fortune by trading opium with China, and this formed the basis of the family's fortune. With growing wealth and increasing confidence, Shiv Narayana Birla moved up the value chain and began chartering cargo ships in partnership with other Marwadi tradesmen to trade opium with China, thus by-passing British middlemen. To facilitate this, he moved to Bombay in 1863.

Baldeo Das Birla
Shiv Narayan Birla had one overwhelming sorrow in his life: he had no children. By the early 1880s, Shiv narayan (Narain) had passed on the baton of his business interests to his adopted son, Baldev Das Birla, established Shivnarayan Baldevdas, a trading house based in Bombay. His son, Baldev Das Birla moved to Calcutta set up Baldevdas Jugalkishor in 1887.
Baldeo Das was succeeded by four sons – Jugal Kishore, Rameshwar Das, Ghanshyam Das and Braj Mohan.

Baldev Das was awarded the Raibahadur title in 1917. In 1920 he retired from business and started living in Banaras pursuing religious studies. In 1925 he was awarded the title of "Raja" by the government of Bihar and Orissa. He was awarded D.Litt. by Banaras Hindu University.

A simplified family tree is given below. It does not include daughters or children who are young (or who died young). Lakshmi Nivas Birla was technically adapted by his uncle Jugal Kishor Birla. As has been noted in the press, some of the branches have been more successful than others. The GD-Basant Kumar-Aditya Vikarm-Kumar Mangalam Birla branch has performed the best, with a group turnover of ₹29,000 Crore in 2004. At the other end is Yashovardhan Birla, who has struggled.

Ghanshyamdas Birla
Ghanshyamdas Birla laid the foundation of his industrial empire by establishing GM Birla Company, trading in jute, in 1911. The First World War began in 1914 greatly increasing the demand for gunny bags. During the war the Birla's worth is estimated to have risen from ₹20 Lakh to ₹80 Lakh. In 1919, he became among the first group of Indian entrepreneurs to become owner of a Jute mill named Birla Jute. In the next few years he acquired several cotton mills. He later started several sugar mills. The publication Hindustan Times was co-founded by GD Birla in 1924 and fully acquired by him in 1933. Hindustan Motors was started in 1942. After India's independence in 1947 he started Grasim (Gwalior Rayon Silk Manufacturing, 1948) and Hindalco (Hindustan Alum Company 1958) among others. He also generously led the grant on the request of Vallabhbhai Patel to lay the foundation of Birla Vishvakarma Mahavidyalaya in Anand, Gujarat.

Baldeo Das, as well his sons were among the key supporters of the swaraj movement led by Mahatma Gandhi, in addition to being dedicated Hindu activists. They were active supporters of the Banaras Hindu University founded by Pt. Madan Mohan Malaviya and were also financial supporters of activities initiated by Mahatma Gandhi. The landmark Laxminarayan Temple in Delhi was built by Jugal Kishore Birla and was inaugurated by Mahatma Gandhi and as asked by Mahatma, all Hindus, including harijans were welcomed in this temple.

In the few decades before India's independence, Indian merchants, including the Birlas, made successful attempts to enter and acquire industries in India which were once dominated by Scots from Britain. This became a part of Mahatma Gandhi's Swadeshi movement.

Birlas remained close to some of the leaders of India, like Sardar Patel after India's independence. When E. M. S. Namboodiripad became the chief minister of Kerala (1957–59), as a result of the first elected Marxist government anywhere, Birlas were invited to establish a pulp factory there.

In recent past, the Birlas, as well as several other Indian industrialists have expanded overseas.

Family Tree

Philanthropy

Birla philanthropy began in the 1880s, when the Birla family donated over 100,000 rupees for setting up goshalas (shelters for the protection of cows) in Kolkata. By early 1900, the Birla family began to support education, influenced by Pandit Madan Mohan Malaviya. They supported educational charities in Kolkata and in Mumbai teaming up with Jamnalal Bajaj. In 1918, the family established the first high school in Pilani now name as birla school pilani it is the one of the oldest school in India. Now they have 6 schools run by birla education trust (BET), which evolved into BITS Pilani, which now has branches in Hyderabad, Goa and Dubai. They also opened a Sanskrit library in Benares and a library in Kolkata. It is well known for the financial support of Indian's freedom struggle and for building temples (see Birla Temple) in several major Indian cities.

The institutions founded by the Birlas include:

Birla High School, Kolkata
Birla Planetariums
 Guru Hanuman Akhara
 Aditya Birla Memorial Hospital
 Birla Institute of Technology and Science, Pilani
 Birla Institute of Management Technology (BIMTECH), Greater Noida 
 Birla Global University Bhubaneswar, Odisha 
 Birla Institute of Technology, Mesra
 Birla Vishwakarma Mahavidyalaya
 Birla Education Trust, Pilani
 Technological Institute of Textile & Sciences, Bhiwani
 M. P. Birla Institute of Fundamental Research
  Rukmani Birla Modern High School, Jaipur
 Modern High School for Girls, Kolkata
 BK Birla Group institutions, Aditya Birla Group Institutions
 K. K. Birla Foundation, established in 1991 by Krishna Kumar Birla, gives the annual awards like Saraswati Samman, Vyas Samman and G.D. Birla Award for Scientific Research.

 Aryaman Vikram Birla Institute of Learning, Haldwani, Uttarakhand

Traditions

In a letter, Ghanshaym Das offered this advice to Aditya (his grandson) when he was studying at MIT: 
“eat only vegetarian food, never drink alcohol or smoke, keep early hours, marry young, switch-off lights when leaving the room, cultivate regular habits, go for a walk everyday, keep in touch with the family, and above all, don’t be extravagant.”

GD Birla instructed his son Basant Kumar to 'never utilize wealth only for fun and frolic,' to 'spend the bare minimum on yourself,' and to deride 'worldly pleasures.'

This advice symbolized the ethic of the rising Marwari community, with restraint and austerity its defining attributes.

Family ties

Although the Birlas are perceived as a single entity, the different branches of the family are now financially independent. However they have continued to maintain family relationships that go back to the times when "Birla Brothers" were an actual entity and Raja Baldevdas was still alive.

GD Birla's both wives died early because of tuberculosis (He remarried after the death of his first wife), a common affliction at that time. The families of his brothers Brij Mohan and Rameshwar Das Birla helped in raising his children. When Yash Birla's parents died in a plane crash, Priyamvada Birla, ("Badi Ma") helped take care of him.

It is reported that Kumar Mangalam Birla had dipped into his own resources to help his beleaguered relative Yash with his financial issues with creditors in order to preserve the family name.

"Tata-Birla" word pair
For many decades the extreme wealth in India was associated with the Tatas and Birlas. The words Tata-Birla were often used together. They were distantly followed by Dalmias (Dalmia-Sahu Jain group) for some time, however Tatas and Birlas have been able to sustain themselves as among the most prominent industrialists in India (for 1939-1997 data see) while others have declined.

A plan for development of India was developed by a group of industrialists in 1944, which was termed the Tata-Birla plan or the Bombay plan, which is said to have served as a blueprint for India's first five-year plan.

References

 
Business families of India